Songtham or Intharacha III was the King of Ayutthaya from 1610/11 to 1628 of the House of Sukhothai. His reign marked the prosperity of the Ayutthaya kingdom after it regained independence from Toungoo Dynasty, and saw the commencement of trade with foreign nations, especially the Dutch and the Japanese. Songtham filled his guards with foreign mercenaries, most notably the Japanese, Yamada Nagamasa.

Origin
Inthraracha was the eldest son of Ekathotsarot with his first class concubine.  He was in the priesthood for 8 years before government servants asked him to leave and ascend the throne with the title Phrachao Songtham at the age of 29.

Rebellion
Ekathotsarot died in 1610/11 and was succeeded by Si Saowaphak.  Ruling less than a year, and showing no ability, he was murdered.  Before his death, Japanese traders stormed the palace and took the king hostage.  He was released only after promising not to harm any of the Japanese.

The Japanese rebels took the Sangharaja as a hostage until they could flee the country.

Prince Chula Chakrabongse states, "the king went insane before he died...His younger son, who had killed the elder brother when their father was alive but helpless, now seized the throne."  He became King Songtham, "The Pious" or "The Just", after he repented his act.

Religious viewpoints

Songtham was said to be very religious - both by the Siamese and van Vliet - as for his religious youth. His name Songtham was a posthumous reverence that means "maintaining the virtues". His reign was the glamorous time for Siamese peasants who were free from  wars and suppression. The most prominent achievement in his reign was the discovery of Buddha's Footprint at Saraburi. Songtham ordered the construction of a temple, Wat Phra Phutthabat, over the footprint - the footprint itself can still be seen today. From Songtham onwards, Ayutthayan kings paid annual respect to the Buddha's Footprint in a grand river procession.

Martial affairs
On martial affairs, however, King Songtham was less successful. In 1621 he himself led Siamese armies into Cambodia to bring the kingdom under control but was repelled by King Chey Chettha II of Oudong. Songtham sent his brother Uparaja Si Sin to invade again in 1622 and failed. During this invasion, King Songtham was supported by the Dutch East India Company. Two warships from Batavia were sent by Governor General Jan Pieterszoon Coen to assist the Siamese fleet. In, 1622 King Anaukpetlun of Pegu took Tavoy away from the Siamese.

During his reign, Cambodia and Lanna revolted and became independent once more.

Foreign relations
The English first arrived aboard the East India Company ship Globe in 1612, delivering a letter from King James I.  They were given a place between the Japanese and Dutch in Ayutthaya, and were later joined by the French East India Company.  However, the English closed their factory in 1622.  Songtham signed a treaty with the Dutch on 12 June 1617.  All trading however, was through the King's government.  Colonies from China, Malay, Japan, Burma, Cambodia, Laos, and Vietnam were tolerated.

Songtham sent four embassies (about 20 people each) to the Japanese shōgun in 1621, 1623, 1626, 1629, to Shogun Tokugawa Hidetada and Iemitsu.

Dutch ship
In 1624, captain Fernando de Silva (not to be confused with governor of the Philippines Fernando de Silva) led a Spanish contingent to sack a Dutch ship near the Siamese shoreline. This enraged Songtham who held the Dutch in great preference and ordered the attacks and seizures of all the Spaniards. The Portuguese, however, were treated alike and all the Iberians were technically disgraced from Siam after nearly a hundred years of royal support.

Successor
Songtham wanted his son, Chettha, to succeed him, though he was young.  He therefore asked Phraya Siworawong, or Prasat Thong, to protect him from danger.  After Songtham's death, Siworawong arrested and executed all those who had been opposed to Songtham's wishes.

Ancestry

References

Sukhothai dynasty
Kings of Ayutthaya
17th-century monarchs in Asia
1590 births
1628 deaths
Princes of Ayutthaya
16th-century Thai people
17th-century Thai people